Livingston is an unincorporated community located in Madison County, Mississippi, United States.

Once a thriving commercial center, Livingston was nearly deserted by the Civil War.  Recent commercial and residential development has revived the lost community.

History
In 1829, the county seat was moved from Beatties Bluff to Livingston.  A courthouse and jail were built by 1833, and the town was incorporated in 1836.  That same year, the county seat was officially moved to Canton, though Livingston "unofficially" remained the county seat until 1858, because its courthouse continued to be used until that year.

Livingston became an important trading center for nearby plantations.

A Methodist church was established in Livingston around 1830, and there was a Masonic Lodge from 1854 to 1866, when Union forces ransacked and destroyed it.

By the 1850s, railways had been established across the county, and Livingston had been bypassed.  Most of the town's residents moved and businesses shut down, though the post office remained until at least 1902.  The only remains of the original town are a cemetery, and the foundation of the court square.

New development
In 2012, a farmers market opened in Livingston, featuring food and entertainment.  It became a popular summertime destination, and attracted performers such as country music singer Travis Tritt.  Developers began a $73 million construction project in Livingston in 2013, which included an 1800s-style town square, men's barbershop, mercantile store, and office building.  There is also a restaurant called "The County Seat". Two residential developments are also planned.

References

Unincorporated communities in Madison County, Mississippi
Unincorporated communities in Mississippi